"Live Like Horses" is a song written by English musician Elton John and Bernie Taupin, included on John's 1997 album The Big Picture. The album version is sung as a solo by John and the single version, released in 1996, features Italian operatic tenor Luciano Pavarotti singing in his native language on parts of the verses and choruses alternatively with John. The single reached number nine in the UK Singles Chart.

Music video
The video, shot in black and white, was directed by Federico Brugia and produced by Nick Verden for Stark Naked Films. It was filmed in Austria and Shepperton Studios in England and features both John and Pavarotti singing their parts.

Track listings
Europe CD 1
 "Live Like Horses" (studio version) – 5:10
 "Live Like Horses" (Live Finale version) – 5:03
 "I Guess That's Why They Call It The Blues" (live) – 4:42
 "Live Like Horses" (Elton John solo studio version)

Europe CD 2
 "Live Like Horses" (studio version)
 "Live Like Horses" (Live Finale version)
 "Step into Christmas"
 "Blessed"

Personnel
Elton John – piano and vocals
Luciano Pavarotti – vocals (on the single version of this song)
Davey Johnstone – guitar
John Jorgenson – guitar
Bob Birch – bass
Guy Babylon – keyboards
Charlie Morgan – drums and percussion
Angel Voices Choir – backing vocals

Charts

References

External links
"Live Like Horses" (CD 1) at Discogs
"Live Like Horses" (CD 2) at Discogs

1996 singles
Elton John songs
Songs with music by Elton John
Songs with lyrics by Bernie Taupin
Song recordings produced by Chris Thomas (record producer)
The Rocket Record Company singles
Mercury Records singles
Male vocal duets